Ian Macpherson McCallum Stewart (15 July 1929 – 19 March 2017) was a British racing driver from Scotland.

Stewart was regarded by Jim Clark as a highly-strung individual who "at the wheel was as relaxed as anyone". His only appearance in a World Championship Grand Prix came at the 1953 RAC British Grand Prix, in which – due to ignition failure – he failed to finish in his Ecurie Ecosse-entered Connaught-Lea Francis A. Stewart's main competition was as part of the Jaguar racing Ecurie Ecosse team.

Stewart made a name for himself racing a Jaguar XK120 in British national events, winning 23 races in just three seasons, including the Jersey International and the Wakefield Trophy. He was a founder member of Ecurie Ecosse who adopted the colour he had resprayed his XK120 as their team colour, he was also responsible for their distinctive badge. During this period, he was one of three Ecurie Ecosse drivers for the team's debut race at Charterhall, which resulted in a second place for Stewart. It was with the Merchiston team that Stewart won most of his races. This success led to some works outings for the Jaguar marque at Le Mans.

It is often said that during the 1954 Les 24 Heures du Mans he rolled an Aston Martin DB3S on the fast stretch between Arnage and White House corners; that however was Jimmy Stewart, Jackie's older brother. Ian had already retired from racing following a crash in the 1954 Argentinian 1000k sports car race to tend to his family's agricultural and public house businesses in Perth and Kinross.

Racing record

Career highlights

Complete Formula One World Championship results
(key)

Complete 24 Hours of Le Mans results

References

External links
Profile at grandprix.com
Profile at Old Racing Cars

1929 births
2017 deaths
People educated at Cargilfield School
People educated at Edinburgh Academy
Scottish racing drivers
Scottish Formula One drivers
Ecurie Ecosse Formula One drivers
Sportspeople from Edinburgh
24 Hours of Le Mans drivers
World Sportscar Championship drivers